Ludwig Hardt (16 January 1886 – 6 March 1947) was a German actor.

Private life
In 1913 he became the second husband of the painter Emmy Gotzmann.

Filmography

References

External links 

1886 births
1947 deaths
German male actors
People from Prudnik
German emigrants to the United States